Loup Township is one of eighteen townships in Platte County, Nebraska, United States. The population was 189 at the 2020 census. A 2021 estimate placed the township's population at 186.

History
Loup Township was established in 1880.

See also
County government in Nebraska

References

External links
City-Data.com

Townships in Platte County, Nebraska
Townships in Nebraska